Essex station is a stop on Amtrak's Empire Builder line in Essex, Montana.

There currently is no station building at Essex, passengers are shuttled directly to the Inn. 

Essex is a flag stop. That is, the stop is skipped in the event that there are no passengers listed in Amtrak’s digital reservation system to alight or board at the station.

Between 1970 and 1985 there were no regular stops at Essex. In late 2010, Amtrak built a concrete platform with embedded heating coils for automatic snow clearance to replace the former asphalt platform, and also added additional lighting and fencing.

References

External links 

Essex Amtrak Station (USA Rail Guide -- Train Web)

Amtrak stations in Montana
Buildings and structures in Flathead County, Montana
Transportation in Flathead County, Montana
Former Great Northern Railway (U.S.) stations
Railway stations in the United States opened in 1893
1893 establishments in Montana